The list of shipwrecks in 2014 includes ships sunk, foundered, grounded, or otherwise lost during 2014.

January

1 January

3 January

11 January

14 January

15 January

19 January

20 January

21 January

26 January

30 January

February

1 February

5 February

8 February

20 February

21 February

22 February

26 February

March

6 March

7 March

9 March

10 March

15 March

17 March

19 March

22 March

25 March

26 March

Unknown date

April

1 April

4 April

6 April

15 April

16 April

17 April

22 April

24 April

25 April

28 April

May

5 May

9 May

10 May

15 May

24 May

26 May

29 May

Unknown date

June

1 June

5 June

9 June

18 June

19 June

22 June

30 June

July

2 July

3 July

4 July

7 July

10 July

14 July

15 July

16 July

17 July

19 July

23 July

28 July

August

4 August

7 August

8 August

11 August

12 August

15 August

16 August

18 August

22 August

23 August

24 August

25 August

September

1 September

4 September

5 September

6 September

10 September

13 September

14 September

15 September

16 September

21 September

30 September

October

5 October

8 October

10 October

12 October

15 October

17 October

19 October

28 October

November

4 November

6 November

9 November

11 November

12 November

16 November

18 November

19 November

21 November

26 November

30 November

December

1 December

2 December

3 December

6 December

8 December

11 December

12 December

14 December

18 December

22 December

26 December

28 December

References

2014
 
Shipwrecks